The 1959 Princeton Tigers football team was an American football team that represented Princeton University during the 1958 NCAA University Division football season. Princeton tied for fifth in the Ivy League.

In their third year under head coach Dick Colman, the Tigers compiled a 4–5 record but outscored opponents 124 to 97. Frank C. Szvetecz was the team captain.

Princeton's 3–4 conference record tied for fifth-best in the Ivy League. The Tigers were outscored 82 to 76 by Ivy opponents.

Princeton played its home games at Palmer Stadium on the university campus in Princeton, New Jersey.

Schedule

References

Princeton
Princeton Tigers football seasons
Princeton Tigers football